Caropsis is a genus of flowering plants in the family Apiaceae. Its only species is Caropsis verticillatoinundata, native to France and Portugal.

References 

Monotypic Apiaceae genera
Apiaceae